Weston Fen is a  biological Site of Special Scientific Interest north of Weston-on-the-Green in Oxfordshire.

This site has diverse habitats, including a fast-flowing stream, species-rich, calcareous fen, willow carr, hazel woodland, limestone grassland and marshy grassland. There are several rare species of beetle, such as Sphaerius acaroides, Eubria palustris, Silis ruficollis and Agabus biguttatus.

The site is private land, but a public footpath runs through it.

References

 
Sites of Special Scientific Interest in Oxfordshire